Kemmerer Municipal Airport  is in Lincoln County, Wyoming, United States, two miles northwest of the city of Kemmerer, which owns it.

The FAA's National Plan of Integrated Airport Systems (2009-2013) categorizes it as a general aviation airport.

Facilities
It has three runways: 4/22 is 2,668 by 60 feet (813 x 18 m) concrete; 10/28 is 3,250 by 60 feet (991 x 18 m) turf/dirt; 16/34 is 8,208 by 75 feet (2,502 x 23 m) asphalt.

In the year ending April 30, 2007 the airport had 3,400 aircraft operations, an average of 283 per month: 97% general aviation and 3% military.

References

External links 
 City of Kemmerer, official website
 Aerial photo as of 25 August 1994 from USGS The National Map
 
 

Airports in Wyoming
Buildings and structures in Lincoln County, Wyoming
Transportation in Lincoln County, Wyoming
Kemmerer, Wyoming